Abibus or Habibus of Edessa (–322), also known as Abibus the New, was a Christian Deacon who was martyred at Edessa under Emperor Licinius.

Life 
Abibus was born in Edessa (modern-day Şanlıurfa, Turkey), in the Roman province of Osroene, in about AD 307. He was ordained a deacon, and the Emperor ordered the arrest of Abibus for his zealous spreading of Christianity. Abibus appeared in front of his executioners not wanting any Christian to have been suffered during his searching.

Abibus was sentenced to be burned at the stake. The martyr entered the fire himself. After the flames were extinguished his body was found undamaged by his mother and relatives. According to the Synaxaristes, Christians took his relics and buried them with those of the fellow martyrs Gurias and Samonas. With Gurias and Samonas, he is venerated as one of the "avengers of unfulfilled contracts". He was buried in Syria in 322.

Feast 
Abibus' individual feast day is 2 September in the old Syrian martyrology and 2 November in the Eastern Orthodox church. In the Roman Catholic Church he is celebrated on 15 November, with Gurias and Samonas.

References

Sources
Holweck, F. G. A Biographical Dictionary of the Saints. St. Louis, MO: B. Herder Book Co. 1924.

External links
http://www.santiebeati.it/dettaglio/90209

322 deaths
Mesopotamian saints
4th-century Christian martyrs
4th-century Romans
Year of birth uncertain